Chung Chun Rice Dog, also known as Chung Chun Rice Hot Dog and Chungchun Ssal, is a restaurant chain with more than 300 locations internationally. In the United States, the business operates in Los Angeles, San Diego, and Seattle.

The business serves hot dogs with various batters, dips, sauces and toppings such as panko breadcrumbs, Korean ramen noodles, granulated sugar, potato, and squid ink. Its signature dish is a Korean-inspired take on a corn dog, the rice dog. The dog-on-a-stick is dipped into rice flour batter and rolled in panko before frying, which creates a crispier crust than the traditional cornbread-battered hot dog.

Reception 
Dylan Joffe, Maggy Lehmicke, Gabe Guarente, and Jade Yamazaki Stewart included the business in Eater Seattle's 2022 overview of Seattle's best inexpensive meals.

References 

Asian restaurants in Seattle
Chinatown–International District, Seattle
Hot dog restaurants
Hot dog restaurants in the United States
Asian restaurants in Los Angeles
Restaurants in San Diego